Not Guilty is a 1919 British silent comedy crime film directed by Arrigo Bocchi and starring Kenelm Foss, Charles Vane and Hayford Hobbs. The screenplay concerns a barrister who takes on his own case when he has to defend himself in court for tricking a millionaire out of money for a good cause.

Cast
 Kenelm Foss as Sir Graham Carfax  
 Charles Vane as Andrew McTaggart  
 Hayford Hobbs as Donald McTaggart  
 Olive Atkinson as Minnie Day  
 Barbara Everest as Hetty Challis  
 Bert Wynne as Tom Dent  
 Evelyn Harding as Matron  
 Philip Hewland as Dillingham

References

Bibliography
 Low, Rachael. History of the British Film, 1918-1929. George Allen & Unwin, 1971.

External links

1919 films
1910s crime comedy films
British silent feature films
British crime comedy films
Films directed by Arrigo Bocchi
Films set in England
British black-and-white films
1919 comedy films
1910s English-language films
1910s British films
Silent crime comedy films